Ashley Nicole Sanchez (born March 16, 1999) is an American soccer player who plays as a forward for the Washington Spirit and the United States national team.

Early life
Sanchez is from Monrovia, California. She is of Mexican descent, with roots in Jalisco.

Sanchez played youth soccer for Santa Anita SC, Legends FC, and So Cal Blues.

College career
Sanchez joined the UCLA Bruins in 2017. She had considered going to University of Southern California, but committed to UCLA in eighth grade.

As a first-year, Sanchez was named to the first eleven of the all-conference Pac-12 team. Sanchez scored six goals and had nine assists during the regular season for UCLA.

Club career
She was drafted by the Washington Spirit in January 2020.

International career
Sanchez is a United States youth international at under-14, under-15, under-17, under-20, and under-23 levels. She captained the United States at the 2016 FIFA U-17 Women's World Cup and also played at the 2016 FIFA U-20 Women's World Cup and the 2018 FIFA U-20 Women's World Cup. In 2016, Sanchez became the first player in United States history to play in multiple world cups in the same year.

Sanchez received her first call-up to the United States senior team in March 2016.

Career statistics

International

International goals

Honors
Washington Spirit
 NWSL Championship: 2021
United States

 CONCACAF Women's Championship: 2022

 SheBelieves Cup: 2022, 2023

References

External links
 

1999 births
Living people
American women's soccer players
United States women's under-20 international soccer players
United States women's international soccer players
American sportspeople of Mexican descent
Women's association football forwards
UCLA Bruins women's soccer players
Sportspeople from Pasadena, California
Soccer players from California
Washington Spirit draft picks
Washington Spirit players
National Women's Soccer League players
Competitors at the 2019 Summer Universiade